At the 1920 Summer Olympics held in Antwerp, 29 athletics events were contested, all for men only. The competitions were held from August 15, 1920, to August 23, 1920.

Medal summary

Medal table

Participating nations
509 athletes from 25 nations competed. Czechoslovakia, Egypt, Estonia, Monaco, New Zealand, and Spain competed for the first time.

References
 
 

 
1920
1920 Summer Olympics events
O